Thomas Freeman (13 June 1894 – 19 June 1965) was an Australian cricketer. He played one first-class match for Tasmania in 1913/14.

See also
 List of Tasmanian representative cricketers

References

External links
 

1894 births
1965 deaths
Australian cricketers
Tasmania cricketers
Cricketers from Hobart